St. Benedict Preparatory School is a private, Roman Catholic pre-K through grade 8 school in Chicago, Illinois.  It is a member of the Roman Catholic Archdiocese of Chicago. St. Benedict Preparatory School is located on the North Side of Chicago at Irving Park Road and Leavitt St.

History
Founded in 1902, St. Benedict School in 1950 expanded to include a high school. St. Benedict is a co-educational preparatory school located on the North Side of Chicago. 
St. Benedict High School is one of two remaining Archdiocese of Chicago run high schools. In February 2017 St. Benedict Preparatory School announced it would be closing its high school. The last graduating class was in June 2019. St. Benedict Preparatory will continue its mission to serve families with Pre-Kindergarten through Grade 8 children.

Athletics
Fall Sports
Girls and Boys Cross Country
Girls Volleyball

Winter Sports
Girls and Boys Basketball
Girls Cheerleading

Spring Sports
Girls and Boys Track & Field
Girls Softball
Boys Baseball
Boys Volleyball

External links
Official St. Benedict Preparatory School Website
Official St. Benedict Preparatory Alumni Website
Official St. Benedict Parish website

References

Catholic schools in Chicago
Catholic secondary schools in Illinois
Educational institutions established in 1950
1950 establishments in Illinois